The 1959 Hengchun earthquake struck the southern tip of Taiwan on August 15. With a Richter magnitude of 7.1, it was the tenth deadliest earthquake in twentieth century Taiwan, killing 16 or 17 people.

Earthquake
The earthquake was felt throughout Taiwan and also in the Penghu islands off Taiwan's western coast.

Damage
According to Taiwan's Central Weather Bureau the casualties and damage were as follows:
17 dead
33 seriously injured
35 lightly injured
1,214 dwellings completely destroyed
1,375 dwellings partially destroyed
Due to Hengchun's exposed position on the southern tip of Taiwan, residents frequently built heavy houses of stone to counter both the effects of typhoons and the seasonal northwesterly monsoon winds. These structures effectively resisted the effects of wind, but fared poorly in earthquakes, collapsing and trapping the occupants.

The shock occurred in the late afternoon, which meant that many people were outdoors when it struck, lessening casualties from building collapse. The estimated cost of the damage (in 1959 New Taiwan Dollars) was NT$24,111,920 for private housing, and NT$6,127,000 for damaged or collapsed school buildings, giving a total of just over NT$30m.

See also
List of earthquakes in 1959
List of earthquakes in Taiwan

References

External links

Earthquakes in Taiwan
Hengchun Earthquake, 1959
Hengchun
Tsunamis in Taiwan
1959 disasters in Taiwan